Christian monasticism in Ethiopia is heavily influenced by spiritual practice, asceticism and hermits since Aksumite era in the sixth century. The Nine Saints from the Byzantine Empire has been impetus for monasticism in Ethiopia, which also continued during the Zagwe and Solomonic periods.
 
Most monasteries are located in geographically mountainous or hill places that are considered unreachable and handicapped for pilgrimage. Debre Libanos and Debre Damo are best example for such location. Monastery often have title of "Debre" and Gedam" attached to community of monks and nuns.

Overview

The essence of monasticism is sacramental and transcendent sign in Ethiopia. As tabots associated with angels, Ethiopian monks are considered messenger of God that transcends from previous concept of theosis and is interpreted as a form of physical transformation. In terms of gender, monks usually represent the larger section in the Ethiopian clergy whose "total number has been estimated at from 10% to 20% of the population, particularly the male population"; men constitute 80% of the monastics in Ethiopia. There are also substantial number of nuns in every monastery. Nuns often do not considerate gender gap by assigning male or female superiority and responded that "God does not distinguish between male and female", and view monastic life as "mimesis of the life of Christ".

Monastery of Ethiopia usually are not founded enclosed or fortified structure, but most are in mountainous range through ambas, terrain, or hillside. Examples of such monasteries include Debre Damo, Debre Libanos and monasteries around Lake Tana islands. It is difficult to characterized Ethiopian monasteries from obvious larger "bounded" cenobitic (communal) sites such as Debre Damo and Debre Libanos. In general, Ethiopian church attributed to monastery because they associated with "Debre" or "Gedam" name and attach to community of monks and nuns.

In Addis Ababa, Orthodox Christians endorse media promotion about religion, but are debated how to use correctly of promoting asceticism, humility, and attention to God, but avoided pride.

Historical context

Kingdom of Aksum
The Ethiopian monastery has played vital role in sociocultural and economic node within the Christian society in the Ethiopian Highlands.  The concept of Christian monasticism dates back to Kingdom of Aksum through missionaries called Nine Saints around the sixth century. The early monasticism was similar to adjacent contemporary powers, such as Egypt, Nubia and the Levant. As in Egypt, the monastery of Ethiopia unlikely had active role in Christianization of secular polity.

According to mainstream historical records, Christianity reached to the Axumite Empire during the reign of King Ezana in 330, although traditional accounts different the introduction of Christianity to early Church period. Christianity persisted through the Early Middle Ages and many large church buildings were constructed in northern province of Ethiopia followed by rapid change in material culture (e.g., coinage, funerary tradition). 

Christianity also survived through decline of Kingdom of Aksum in seventh century and continued until the Dark Age, which written records overwhelming from external sources. The fall of Aksum would categorize into two reasons: the first is anonymity of its rulers and their size and status due to decentralized structure. The History of the Patriarchs of Alexandria is best example of this reason, and the second one is most accounts came from Arab writers, often travellers and wrote much information about the economic status of the period.

Zagwe dynasty
Aksumite successor, the Zagwe dynasty, reinvigorated Christendom after founding its capital Roha in the 12th century, and later renamed Lalibela after eponymous king of the same name. During the reign of Gebre Meskel Lalibela, eleven rock-hewn churches were constructed within the town as well as built churches built in caves in the countryside around Lalibela. 

However, historical records even in this period became more obscure than Aksum. The Gadlat (hagiographies) was the main source of notable kings and saints' description and are written later than the actual events they describe, although oral history differs with the respect of archeological works at Lalibela.

Solomonic period
Monastery became essence life in social and economic role during the Solomonic period since the ascension of Yekuno Amlak (r. 1270–1285), providing charismatic religious leaders such as Abune Tekle Haymanot (1215–1313) and Iyasus Mo'a (1214–1294). Monasteries attracted royal patronage and became important centers of wealth within the politics where secular power vested in the Emperor of Ethiopia and his court as well as the feudal system.

Until the Ethiopian Revolution in 1974, monasticism was important to economy and agriculture in the highlands area of gult system. After the abolition of monarchy in 1975, monasteries became nationalized during the Derg regime which declined their power.

References

Ethiopian Orthodox Tewahedo Church